Merosargus lampronotus is a species of soldier fly in the family Stratiomyidae.

Distribution
Costa Rica, Panama.

References

Stratiomyidae
Insects described in 1941
Diptera of North America